The soundtrack for the 1987 Oliver Stone movie Wall Street was composed and arranged by Stewart Copeland. Released on LP record in 1988, a CD version was produced in 1993. Copeland is praised for a "relentless, pounding soundtrack, very much a product of its time". The music for the film also contains songs by Frank Sinatra ("Fly Me to the Moon") and by David Byrne and Brian Eno.

Track list
"Kent Unpredictable"
"Dietz Just Come Right in Here, Denise"
"Talk We Know Where You Live"
"Tick We Feel Too Much"
"Trend He Has Heart"
"Bud's Scam"
"Are You with Me?"
"Trading Begins"
"Tall Weeds"
"Break-Up"
"Anacott Steel"
"End Title Theme"

References

1987 soundtrack albums